The 1987 Japanese motorcycle Grand Prix was the first round of the 1987 Grand Prix motorcycle racing season. It took place on the weekend of 27–29 March 1987 at the Suzuka Circuit.

Classification

500 cc

References

Japanese motorcycle Grand Prix
Japanese
Motorcycle
Japanese motorcycle Grand Prix